Edward Locke is an American playwright.

Edward or Eddie Locke may also refer to:
Eddie Locke (baseball) (1923–1992), American baseball player
Eddie Locke (1930–2009), American jazz drummer

See also
Ned Locke, TV and radio personality
Edward Lock, cricketer